Enforcer (also known informally as a "Rammit", "the Sam", "Donker", "Sam", "Bosher", and "the big red key") is the term given to a specially designed manual battering ram manufactured by Sigma Security Devices Ltd and currently used by British Police forces, fire services and other agencies to aid in gaining entry to premises in confined spaces.

Construction 
The Enforcer is a 16 kg hardened steel construction with a steel pad at the impact end so that it can absorb the impact, and a handle at the opposite end angled so that the user can swing accurately at inward-opening doors without actually applying their own pressure more than necessary. Further, there is a handle in the middle of the tube aiding the user in handling. The Enforcer can apply more than three tonnes of impact force to door locks. It is 58 cm long.

Police use
In London the Metropolitan Police Services' Armed Response Vehicles and most station vans carry them. Within most forces an officer can only use such a tool once they have attended a course receiving training in the safe handling and operational use. Also, most forces insist that the user wears gloves to cushion the user's hands from the shock created when a door is struck with the ram.

References

External links
 Enforcer Training Manual (PDF)

Law enforcement equipment